Pseudographis is a genus of fungi belonging to the family Rhytismataceae.

The genus was first described by William Nylander in 1855.

The species of this genus are found in Eurasia and Northern America.

References

Leotiomycetes
Leotiomycetes genera